No Worse for the Wear is the third studio album by Orange County pop punk band Big Drill Car. It is the only album without their classic original line-up, featuring new members Keith Fallis and Darrin Norris. The band reached a little success through the album, if only for a short time before their 13-year break-up, from 1995 to 2008. The release of No Worse for the Wear would also gain Big Drill Car supporting slots on national and world tours with bands such as The Offspring (who had just released Smash to unexpected success and acclaim) and Guttermouth.

The songs "The Shake", "Nogaina", and "What You Believe" were featured, amongst other Cargo/Headhunter Records artists, in the 1997 Sega Saturn/Sony PlayStation game Courier Crisis.

Like many Big Drill Car albums, No Worse for the Wear is currently out of print.

Track listing

Personnel
Frank Daly - Vocals 
Mark Arnold - Guitar
Darrin Norris - Bass
Keith Fallis - Drums

Additional personnel
Bill Stevenson - Producer 
Stephen Egerton - Producer 
Jeff Powell - Engineer 
Jeffrey Reed - Engineer 
John Hampton - Mixing

References

1994 albums
Big Drill Car albums
Albums produced by Bill Stevenson (musician)